Karilatsi is a village in Kanepi Parish, Põlva County in southeastern Estonia.

As of 2011 Census, the settlement's population was 61.

Karilatsi village is home to Põlva Peasant Museum, established in 1972.

References

External links
Põlva Peasant Museum in Karilatsi

Villages in Põlva County